Ulupono Initiative (Ulupono) is a Hawai‘i-based organization that uses non-profit grants and conducts advocacy with the stated goals of more local food; increasing clean renewable energy; and reducing waste.

eBay founder Pierre Omidyar and his wife Pam established Ulupono in 2009, after each spent parts of their childhood in Hawai‘i. Pierre Omidyar has also founded other Hawai‘i-based organizations such as Honolulu Civil Beat and Ohana Real Estate Developers. Pierre Omidyar has publicly committed to giving away the vast majority of his wealth within his lifetime and in 2010 joined Bill Gates and Warren Buffett’s “giving pledge”.

Ulupono Overview 
Ulupono does: 
 Non-profit grants including creating and supporting school gardens, farm-to-school networks, agricultural incubators, as well as leadership development in these key areas.
Advocacy to shape and influence state and county measures and amendments that they believe will make a meaningful impact in Hawai‘i.
 Research to help inform its work, including a local food market demand study of O‘ahu shoppers to gauge consumer demand and studies about grass and water for grass-fed productivity.

Starting in 2020, Ulupono has shifted its focus from financial investments to policy/advocacy due to its lack of successful investments. Ulupono previously conducted for-profit investments including; solar energy, biofuels, electric vehicle charging networks, expanded local agriculture such as re-establishing homegrown dairy and grass-fed beef industries, and waste reduction projects. Ulupono had typically focused on several investments each year of $1 million to $3 million in key mission-focused projects, while often seeking a governance role as part of its investment terms. As of December 2017, Ulupono invested approximately $77,104,422 toward achieving its mission and goals. Of its funding allocations in their portfolio 47.5% are dedicated to local food, 48.5% are dedicated to renewable energy, 3.0% are dedicated to waste reduction, and 1.0% is dedicated to water management. Of Ulupono's 57 investments since inception, 2 (Clearfuels and Volta) has brought more cash inflow than outflow (3.5%). Total investment inflow is $14M and outflow is $66M, leading to a heavy loss for the company, which was then used as business loss to reduce Pierre Omidyar's tax liability.

Ulupono has also provided grant funding to Bikeshare Hawaii to start and expand operations.

When Ulupono was founded in 2009, Kyle Datta and Robin Campaniano were brought on to co-lead Ulupono as its first leadership team. Current leadership includes Murray Clay starting in 2011 and Amy Hennessey starting in 2012.

Policy
Ulupono believes transformation can be achieved at a policy level through the support of state and county measures and amendments. However, Ulupono does not work directly with the community to advance its goals. Ulupono also does not donate to political campaigns or candidates.

Most notably, Ulupono was a strong advocate of a Hawaii state constitutional amendment to allow farmers, ranchers and owners of other agricultural endeavors to request special purpose revenue bonds (SPRB). The measure passed with 50.2% of the vote in Hawaii's 2014 general election. Ulupono, the main funder of the "Local Food Coalition", contributed $500,000 of the $507,400 (98.5%) raised for the amendment's passage.

Investment Portfolio 
Ulupono looked to invest in companies and organizations that will help achieve its goals in its sectors of interest, especially those that crossed between its sectors.

Ulupono deal flow was largely sourced by having potential projects come to them rather than going out into the community.

Ulupono has invested in companies including Hawaii Dairy Farms on Kauai, Honolulu Seawater Air Conditioning, Sopogy, SolarCity, Blue Ocean Mariculture, Hawaii BioEnergy, Phycal, Kapalua Farms on Maui, Oceanic Institute Research Feed Mill, Ibis Networks, and Bioenergy Hawaii.

As a private equity firm, its hours of operation are from 9am to 5pm.

Controversies
Hawaii Dairy Farms

Ulupono was unsuccessful in starting Hawaii Dairy Farms, a 550 acre dairy farm with 699 to 2,000 cows in Mahaulepu, Kauai, six-tenths of a mile upslope from the ocean. The project was opposed by local community groups and the Grand Hyatt Kauai Resort and Spa. In 2015, Friends of Mahaulepu sued Hawaii Dairy Farms, alleging violation of the federal Clean Water Act by installing irrigation systems and wells without a stormwater construction permit. Hawaii Dairy Farms was ordered to pay more than half a million dollars in attorney fees and court costs and $125,000 to fund a supplemental environmental project for stream-bank restoration and endangered species protection at Makauwahi Cave Reserve. In June 2016, Hawaii Dairy Farms completed a draft environmental impact statement on the project and submitted it to the state Department of Health in January 2017. In March 2017, the Department of Health wouldn't approve the final Environmental Impact Statement and Hawaii Dairy Farms withdrew the document from consideration. Honolulu-based Ulupono received $875,000 in state tax credits under a 2008 law that created incentives for landowners to preserve prime farmland for agricultural use in perpetuity. Ulupono said in a written statement that it is disappointed that Hawaii Dairy Farms didn’t succeed but that the tax credit program provided an incentive to take on risk with the project it estimated would cost $17.5 million.

Honolulu Seawater Air Conditioning

Ulupono is the majority owner of the Honolulu Seawater Air Conditioning project after having made an initial investment on August 5, 2013 and forcibly buying out most of the remaining shareholders. The proposed $250 million project was appropriated State of Hawaii government backed Special Purpose Revenue Bonds in 2005 of up to $48 million with extensions in 2010 and 2015; in 2007 of up to $20 million with an extension in 2012; and in 2009 of up to $77 million with extensions in 2014 and 2019 (expiration in June 30, 2024) after consistently not completing the project in time. The Hawaii State Legislature did not renew the Special Purpose Revenue Bond allocation from 2005 in the 2020 legislative session. On December 19, 2020, Honolulu Seawater Air Conditioning announced it was abandoning its development efforts and would wind down its operations by the end of January 2021, citing "financial sustainability could not be assured". "Two years ago officials told Pacific Business News they had finalized a deal with the state to cool seven state office buildings and the state Capitol and said they expected to break ground in late 2019, but that never happened". Murray Clay, Ulupono’s president and a Honolulu Seawater board member, said the decision to call off the project was not easy. "Letting go of our dream is not easy," he said in a statement. "Despite all of the environmental benefits and the project’s ability to help move our state toward greater energy self-sufficiency, it became clear it would not have been prudent to pursue this further." "Ulupono invested more than $6 million into the project".

2014 Hawaii Constitutional Amendment 2

In 2014, Hawaii Constitutional Amendment 2, which "allows the State to issue special purpose revenue bonds to assist agricultural enterprises on any type of land, rather than only important agricultural lands" passed with 50.2%, 0.2% more than required and making it the closest ballot initiative in Hawaii's history. Ulupono contributed $500,000 of the $507,400 (98.5%) raised for the amendment's passage. The League of Women Voters noted the concern about Amendment 2's passage was, "Large, for-profit agribusiness will also be eligible for low cost, privately-funded loans. This will give them a competitive advantage over small farms".

Honolulu Rail Project Public-Private Partnership

In March 2017, Ulupono released its Honolulu rail system public-private partnership study that argued the City and County of Honolulu project should be restructured to a public-private partnership. Central to its findings, the P3 analysis concluded that the Honolulu Rail Transit Project remains dependent on public funding to close the $2 billion funding gap. Delays in identifying the funding source could further delay the project, potentially costing the taxpayers of Hawaii close to $114 million per year. The Honolulu Authority for Rapid Transportation, which was trying to get a handle on the $10 billion Honolulu proposed rail system, hired Ernst and Young Infrastructure Advisors to study whether P3 was a viable option.

“Ronald Tutor, CEO of Los Angeles-based Tutor Perini Corp. disclosed in a July 29 call with investors that his construction company is part of a team that’s competing against one other joint venture for rail’s P3 award. As part of the deal, the team that’s selected would build rail’s remaining four miles and eight stations into downtown Honolulu. HART has estimated that construction work to cost around $1.4 billion. However, during the call Tutor said his company’s bid was ‘over $2 billion”.

The City and County of Honolulu announced on September 25, 2020 that it is pulling out of the effort to land a private-sector partner to complete construction and operate the 20-mile system during its first 30 years. Honolulu Authority for Rapid Transportation said they’re still trying to find a way to move forward on a process that has already taken two years. Subsequently, the City and County of Honolulu announced on November 20, 2020 that it is canceling its public-private partnership efforts after two unsuccessful years. "Precisely what caused the P3 pursuit’s failure hasn’t been disclosed, although one of the companies competing for the contract shared in an earnings call this summer that its proposal was hundreds of millions of dollars more than what HART and the city had budgeted for the remaining construction. At the HART board’s meeting earlier Friday (November 20, 2020), Robbins said that HART had spent at least $10 million on outside consultant work for the now aborted P3 pursuit".

Bikeshare Hawaii

Ulupono helped found, expand, and is the Chair of the Board of Directors for Bikeshare Hawaii. According to the City and County of Honolulu's Auditor's Office, "Honolulu’s 3-1/2-year-old bikeshare program known as Biki has not benefited the city and lacks accountability and transparency. Altogether, the audit said that under its agreement with Bikeshare Hawaii, the city lost out on an estimated $460,728 in revenue in 2019 due to the displacement of metered stalls and permit fee exemptions. The city did not share in the nearly $1.4 million in sponsorship revenue between fiscal years 2017 and 2020. In addition, Biki does not report sponsorship amounts to DTS as required by contract".  Due to the COVID-19 pandemic, Biki will cut services by 60% including limiting call center hours and bike rebalancing and "without new financial support, the program may not be able to sustain itself much longer.”

Human Rights Policy 
Per edict from Pierre Omidyar, Ulupono does not invest in, patronize, or support any organization, company, or product that is known to have slavery or human trafficking in its supply chain or anywhere else in its operations. If Ulupono learns of such labor practices for itself or its investments, including subcontractors, the company will correct the situation or terminate its involvement.

References

External links
Ulupono Website
Ulupono Twitter Page
Pierre Omidyar
E. Kyle Datta

Environmental organizations based in Hawaii
Environmental organizations established in 2009